{{Infobox company
|name = Notes Co., Ltd.
|trade_name = Type-Moon
|logo = Type-moon.svg
|logo_size = 200px
|type = Private (Yūgen gaisha)
|foundation = 1998
|location = 4 Chome-2-２ Asakusabashi, Taitō-ku, Tōkyō-to 111-0053
|num_employees =
|key_people = 
|industry = 
|products = {{ublist|The Garden of Sinners|Tsukihime|Fate/stay night|Witch on the Holy Night}}
|subsid = 
|revenue =
|homepage = 
}}
Type-Moon (stylized as TYPE-MOON) is a Japanese game company, best known for their visual novels, co-founded by author Kinoko Nasu and illustrator Takashi Takeuchi. It is also known under the name  for its publishing and corporate operations, as it is the company official name, while Type-Moon is a brand name as a homage to the original doujin group. After creating the popular visual novel Tsukihime as a doujin soft circle, Type-Moon has since incorporated and produced the even more popular visual novel Fate/stay night, which became its most well-known title. The latter has also been adapted into anime and manga series that have amassed a global fanbase.

History
Type-Moon was founded by artist Takashi Takeuchi and writer Kinoko Nasu, whose first project was the novel Kara no Kyoukai, which was originally released in October 1998 and reprinted in 2004. The company name Type-Moon comes from one of Nasu's older works, written for the angel-themed doujin anthology Angel Voice in May 1999. On December 28, 2000, Type-Moon released the adult Windows visual novel Tsukihime, which sold extremely well and amassed a large fanbase because of its comprehensive and expansive storyline and writer Kinoko Nasu's unique style of storytelling. The game led to the creation of numerous top-selling merchandise, memorabilia, and a fanbase numbering millions worldwide. Tsukihime was adapted soon after in 2003 into an anime series, Lunar Legend Tsukihime, which was produced by J.C.Staff and licensed by Geneon in North America, and a manga series based upon Lunar Legend Tsukihime that has been published between October 2003 and September 2010.

Soon after, on January 21, 2001, Type-Moon released a bonus disk to Tsukihime, Plus-Disk, which featured four short stories and various multimedia. In August 2001, Type-Moon released a fan disk to Tsukihime, Kagetsu Tohya, and soon, in April 2003, released Tsuki-Bako, a specially packaged three-disk set that included Tsukihime, Plus-Disk, and Kagetsu Tohya, as well as a remixed soundtrack for both games and more multimedia.

On December 30, 2002, Type-Moon, in association with French-Bread (known as Watanabe Seisakujo before 2003), released their first fighting game, Melty Blood, a PC-based doujin game based on the Tsukihime universe, which was very popular and was followed soon after by an expansion, Melty Blood Re-ACT, released on May 20, 2004, to which a patch update, Melty Blood Re-ACT Final Tuned, was released as a free download over the Internet. Melty Blood is widely considered among the best doujin 2D fighting games ever made and has been released as an arcade port, Melty Blood: Act Cadenza, on March 25, 2005, and was released on the PS2 platform on August 10, 2006.

Type-Moon soon transitioned from a doujin soft organization to a commercial organization. On 30 January 2004, they released the first commercial release, a PC-based adult visual novel game, Fate/stay night, which broke all records on its opening day and became immensely popular. It was later adapted into an anime series that aired 24 episodes in Japan starting 6 January 2006; a second anime series that premiered on October 4, 2014; and a manga series that ran in publication between 26 December 2005 and 26 October 2012, in Monthly Shounen Ace. A sequel to Fate/stay night, Fate/hollow ataraxia, was released on 28 October 2005. Fate/stay night was also released on the PS2 platform on April 19, 2007. A prequel, Fate/Zero, was released as a light novel written by Gen Urobuchi (from nitro+) under Kinoko Nasu's supervision, featuring art by Takashi Takeuchi, in 2006–2007, followed by an animated adaptation by ufotable in 2011–2012.

At Comiket 72 on August 27, 2007, they released the "All Around TYPE-MOON drama CD".

In August 2019, Type-Moon announced that they established a new company called Type-Moon Studio BB, a video game development studio with former Square Enix and Atlus employee Kazuya Nino, who was a director for the series Trauma Center, Etrian Odyssey and Dragon Quest Builders as the head of the studio. According to Nino, the company plans to develop medium to large-scale 3D games in cooperation with external developers and small-scale 2D games developed in-house.

 Releases 
Type-Moon has developed and produced the following:

Tsukihime seriesTsukihime, PC-based adult visual novel game, originally released on December 28, 2000. A television adaptation of the visual novel, Lunar Legend Tsukihime, by J.C.Staff, aired from October 10 to December 26, 2003.Tsukihime Plus-Disc, released on January 21, 2001.Kagetsu Tohya, PC-based Tsukihime fan disk, released on August 13, 2001.Melty Blood, PC-based fighting game, in association with French-Bread, released on December 28, 2002. Manga serialized from June 2005 to August 2011.Melty Blood Re-ACT, PC-based expansion to Melty Blood, released on May 20, 2004.Melty Blood Re-ACT Final Tuned, update patch to Melty Blood Re-ACT, released as a free download.talk. and Prelude, are two short stories published in Tsukihime material book's Plus Period published on October 22, 2004, and the Type-Moon's Character material published on August 20, 2006, respectively, intended to act as a prologue to a potential Tsukihime sequel.Melty Blood: Act Cadenza, arcade port to Melty Blood released on March 25, 2005, and re-released on the PS2 platform on August 10, 2006.Melty Blood: Act Cadenza Version B, the updated PC port of Act Cadenza, was released on July 27, 2007.Melty Blood: Actress Again, arcade released on September 19, 2008, and PS2-port on August 20, 2009.Melty Blood: Actress Again Current Code, the first 2D fighting game for Sega RingWide arcade board, was released on 29 July 2010. Ver. 1.07 was released later for Arcade on October 14, 2011, and a PC port on December 30, 2011, along with the Blu-ray release of Carnival Phantasm Season 3 limited edition. An updated version was released on Steam on April 19, 2016.Tsuki no Sango, is a story by Nasu for Maaya Sakamoto's Full Moon Recital Hall, a project organized by the Japanese online magazine Saizensen, that consisted of Sakamoto reading short novels in a theater while an accompanying short animation was aired in the background. Tsuki no Sango was the first of the recitals on December 21, 2010, also got a manga adaptation with a story and art by Sasaki Shōnen.Tsukihime -A piece of blue glass moon-, the first visual novel re-telling the story of Tsukihime. Released on August 26, 2021, for the PlayStation 4 and Nintendo Switch.Melty Blood: Type Lumina, the first Type-Moon fighting game and overall for Xbox console port, as well as a "What-If" story to Tsukihime Remake titles and Reboot to the Melty Blood series, released worldwide on September 30, 2021, on Xbox One, PlayStation 4, Nintendo Switch and Microsoft Windows (Steam).Tsukihime -The other side of red garden-, the second visual novels re-telling the story of Tsukihime.

Fate seriesFate/stay night, PC-based adult visual novel game, released on 30 January 2004. A DVD version was released on 29 March 2006, and a non-ero PS2 port entitled Fate/stay night [Réalta Nua] was released on April 19, 2007, and re-ported non-ero to PC on three versions covering each arc. Currently, four anime adaptations exist of Fate/stay night: the first was produced by Studio Deen and primarily based on the visual novel's Fate route, the second was a movie adaptation of the Unlimited Blade Works route and also produced by Studio Deen, and the third was a TV remake of the Unlimited Blade Works route produced by ufotable. The Heaven's Feel route has been adapted into a movie trilogy by ufotable.Fate/hollow ataraxia, PC-based Fate/stay night sequel, released on 28 October 2005, re-released for PS Vita on 27 November 2014.Fate/school life, is a comedy 4-koma manga by Eiichirou Mashin revolving around the normal life at school of the minor characters of Fate/stay night and Fate/hollow ataraxia, in later volumes, other characters from different TYPE-MOON works would also appear.Fate/Zero, a light novel prequel to Fate/stay night, were released from December 29, 2006, to December 29, 2007. Made in collaboration with Nitroplus. Anime adaptation by ufotable aired from October 1, 2011, to June 23, 2012.Fate/Prototype, is an animated short by Studio Lerche, distributed with the third home release of Carnival Phantasm on December 31, 2011. Based on the Second Tokyo Holy Grail War, it is the original concept of Kinoko Nasu's for Fate/stay night. It has yet to be adapted as a full series, with only a short animated feature and production notes detailing the story.Fate/Prototype: Fragments of Sky Silver, a light novel written by Hikaru Sakurai, illustrated by Nakahara, and published by Kadokawa Shouten, were released from September 10, 2014, to April 26, 2017. It is a prequel of Fate/Prototype, the original version of Fate/stay night with a female protagonist.Fate/kaleid liner Prisma Illya, a spin-off manga series written and illustrated by Hiroyama Hiroshi, serialized in Comp Ace magazine from September 26, 2007, to November 26, 2008, followed by two sequels entitled 2wei! and 3rei!!Fate/tiger colosseum, PSP 3D fighting game, released on 13 September 2007. Made by Capcom and Cavia.Fate/unlimited codes, arcade, PS2, and PSP 3D fighting game, released on 28 October 2008.Fate/Extra, an RPG dungeon-crawler for the PSP-system, released on July 22, 2010. Sequel Fate/Extra CCC was released on March 28, 2013. An anime version titled by Shaft as Fate/Extra Last EncoreFate/Extella: The Umbral Star, an action RPG game released on November 10, 2016, for PS4, PS Vita, Nintendo Switch and Microsoft Windows.Fate/Extella: Link, an action RPG game for PS4, PS Vita, Nintendo Switch and Microsoft Windows released on June 7, 2018 that is a direct sequel to Umbral Star.Fate/Extra Record, a remake of the original Fate/Extra with a revamped battle system and updated visuals. It is the first project by the new Type-Moon Studio BB.Fate/Apocrypha, a light novel by Yuuichirou Higashide and illustrated by Konoe Ototsugu, was released between December 29, 2012, and December 30, 2014, spanning five volumes. An anime adaptation by A-1 Pictures aired between July 2, 2017, and December 30, 2017, with international localization by Netflix.The Case Files of Lord El-Melloi II, a light novel written by Makoto Sanda, illustrated by Sakamoto Mineji and published by TYPE-MOON under their label TYPE-MOON BOOKS on December 30, 2014, to May 17, 2019. It is considered a side-story to Fate/Zero, following one of the protagonists as an adult. A manga adaptation illustrated by Tō Azuma has been serialized. An anime adaptation by Troyca aired from July 6 to September 28, 2019.The Adventures of Lord El-Melloi II, sequel to The Case Files, began publishing on December 25, 2020.Fate/strange fake, a light novel series written by Ryohgo Narita, illustrated by Morii Shizuki, and published in Dengeki Bunko starting on 10 January 2015. It is a remake of the original 2008 April's Fool's web-published one-shot known as Fake/states night, which was later edited and included in TYPE-MOON Ace Vol.2 in 2009. A manga adaptation, also illustrated by Morii Shizuki, is being released alongside the aforementioned current novelization.Fate/Labyrinth, a light novel by Hikaru Sakurai, illustrated by Nakahara. It is a side-story to Fate/Prototype: Fragments of Blue and Silver and was released on January 9, 2016, between Fragments' 3rd and 4th volumes.Fate/Grand Order, an RPG for the Android/iOS that was released on July 30, 2015. The game contains characters from previous TYPE-MOON properties along with new characters. A new class, Shielder, was added to the game. The first chapter of the game was animated by Lay-duce as a television movie titled Fate/Grand Order First Order aired on December 31, 2016.Fate/Grand Carnival, an OVA series that is a spiritual successor to Carnival Phantasm, focusing on characters from Fate/Grand Order.Today's Menu for the Emiya Family, a spin-off manga series written and illustrated by TAa, serialized in Kadokawa Shoten's Young Ace Up starting on 26 January 2016. It received an original net animation adaptation by ufotable from 2018 to 2019. A video game adaptation for the Nintendo Switch was released on April 28, 2021.Fate/Requiem, a light novel by Meteo Hoshriza, published on December 31, 2018. Set in a timeline where a large Holy Grail  War took place, which resulted in everyone having a servant in the aftermath.Fate/type Redline, a spin-off manga series written by Keikenchi and illustrated by Ryoji Hirano, based on the gag manga Koha-Ace.

Ufotable produced a series of seven anime films based on the series between December 1, 2007, and September 28, 2013, and also produced an original video animation episode on February 2, 2011. A final anime film was produced and released in 2013. A manga adaptation illustrated by Sphere Tenku started serialization in September 2010 in Seikaisha's online magazine Saizensen.Notes. is a short novel by Kinoko Nasu and published in May 1999 for an angels-centered doujin anthology Angel Voice.Decoration Disorder Disconnection (DDD), a light novel by Kinoko Nasu and illustrated by Hirokazu Koyama, published irregularly in the Faust mangazine, with two volumes released in 2004, the series is currently on hiatus.Carnival Phantasm, animated OVA series by Lerche based on Take Moon a parody manga created by Eri Takenashi, mixing characters from Tsukihime, Kagetsu Tohya, Melty Blood, Fate/stay night, Fate/hollow ataraxia with minor cameo appearances from Fate/Zero, Fate/EXTRA, Kara no Kyoukai, Mahoutsukai no Hako and KOHA-ACE characters.All Around Type-Moon, is a drama CD released at Comiket 72 on August 17, 2007. Various TYPE-MOON characters interact within Ahnenerbe and find themselves in comedic situations. It has a manga adaptation.428: Shibuya Scramble, Nasu wrote a special scenario for the game, with Takashi Takeuchi providing the character designs. This scenario sequel is an anime, Canaan.Witch on the Holy Night, a visual novel written by Kinoko Nasu, featuring art by Hirokazu Koyama and music by Fukasawa Hideyuki. Originally written and set before The Garden of Sinners and Tsukihime, the story follows a young Aozaki Aoko alongside two new faces – Kuonji Alice and Soujuuro Shizuki. In an interview with 4Gamer, Kinoko Nasu expressed the desire to make a game that feels like a finished work and considers this a success. It was released on 12 April 2012. This is the first Type-Moon visual novel not to be an adult game. An upcoming film adaptation by ufotable has been announced.Fire Girl, a light novel with an original story by ex-Liarsoft member Hoshizora Meteor and illustrations by bunbun, published by Type-Moon under their label TYPE-MOON BOOKS, were released from December 29, 2012, to March 18, 2016.World Conquest Zvezda Plot, a 2014 anime television series directed by Tensai Okamura, written by Hoshizora Meteor and animated by A-1 Pictures.Sekai Seifuku 〜 Shiroi Keito to Manatsu no Berubiaaje, a light novel side-story of World Conquest Zvezda Plot, written by Kimura Kou and illustrated by Kouhaku Kuroboshi was released on March 22, 2014, published under the TYPE-MOON BOOKS label.Girls' Work'' was announced on June 1, 2008, as a PC visual novel work written by ex-Liarsoft members Hoshizora Meteor, Myogaya Jinroku, and Kimura Kou, with character designs by Takenashi Eri, but on December 24, 2010, it was announced to be restarted as a joint animation project with animation production company ufotable and Aniplex. Released date has not been revealed.

References

External links
 
TYPE-MOON's previous official website 
TYPE-MOON's founders and main staff Takashi Takeuchi and Kinoko Nasu's Online Diary 

History of TYPE-MOON

 
Amusement companies of Japan
Video game companies established in 1998
Video game companies of Japan
Video game development companies
Video game publishers
Japanese companies established in 1998